Ernst Wahle (March 25, 1889, Magdeburg – January 21, 1981) was a German archaeologist.

He taught at Heidelberg University. In 1937 he joined the Nazi Party.

Literary works 
 Die Besiedelung Südwestdeutschlands in vorrömischer Zeit nach ihren natürlichen Grundlagen. Ber. RGK 12, 1920, 1-75.	
 Deutsche Vorzeit (German Prehistory), (1932)
 Vorzeit am Oberrhein (Prehistory of the Upper Rhine), 1937
 Frühgeschichte des Germanentums. In: Neue Propyläen-Weltgeschichte Bd. 2 (1940)
 Zur ethnischen Deutung frühgeschichtlicher Kulturprovinzen. Grenzen der frühgeschichtlichen Erkenntnis. Sitzungsber. Heidelberger Akad. Wiss., Phil.-Hist. Kl. 2. Abh.	1 (Heidelberg 1941)
 Frühgeschichte als Landesgeschichte, 1943
 Studien zur Geschichte der prähistorischen Forschung. Abh. Heidelberger Akad. Wiss., Phil.-hist. Kl.	(Heidelberg 1950)
 Ur- und Frühgeschichte im mitteleuropäischen Raum. (B. Gebhardt (Hrsg.), Handbuch der deutschen Geschichte 1) (9. Aufl. München 1999)
 Frühgeschichte weiter gefragt?	Zur Situation einer 'belasteten' Wissenschaft. Die Zeit v. 21.8.1947
 Einheit und Selbständigkeit der prähistorischen Forschung. Schr. Ges. Freunde Mannheims u. d. ehem. Kurpfalz 12 (Mannheim		1974)
 Und es ging mit ihm seinen Weg (Heidelberg 1980) - Autobiographie

References 
 Uwe Gross, Ernst Wahle. Dokumentator verschollener frühmittelalterlicher Funde. Denkmalpfl. Bad.-Württ. 32, 2003, 245-248
 Horst Kirchner (Hrsg.), Ur- und Frühgeschichte als historische Wissenschaft. Festschrift zum 60. Geburtstag von Ernst Wahle (Heidelberg  1950).
 Dietrich Hakelberg, Ernst Wahle im Kontext seiner Zeit. In: H. Steuer (Hrsg.), Eine hervorragend nationale Wissenschaft. Deutsche Prähistoriker zwischen 1900 und 1995 (Berlin 2001) 199-310 (mit Schriftenverzeichnis)

External links 
 Ernst Wahle Dokumentator verschollener frühmittel-alterlicher Funde(PDF)

1889 births
1981 deaths
People from Magdeburg
People from the Province of Saxony
Archaeologists from Saxony-Anhalt
Nazi Party politicians
Militant League for German Culture members
Academic staff of Heidelberg University